Pararcte is a genus of moths of the family Noctuidae. The genus was erected by George Hampson in 1926.

Species
Pararcte immanis (Walker, 1858) Dominican Republic
Pararcte schneideriana (Stoll, [1782]) Suriname

References

Noctuidae